Life on D-Block is the fourth studio album by American rapper Sheek Louch. The album was released on May 19, 2009, by Real Talk Entertainment. The album debuted at number 122 on the Billboard 200 chart, selling 4,300 copies in its first week.

Track listing

Charts

References

2009 albums
Albums produced by Cozmo
Albums produced by Big Hollis
Sheek Louch albums
Real Talk Entertainment albums